Aimone may refer to:

Florencia Aimone (born 1990), team handball player from Argentina
Aimone Alletti (born 1988), Italian male volleyball player
Prince Aimone, Duke of Aosta (1900–1948), Italian prince, officer of the Royal Italian Navy
Prince Aimone, Duke of Apulia (born 1967), first son of Prince Amedeo, 5th Duke of Aosta
Aimone Duce, Italian painter for the court of Savoy-Acaia, active during 1417 and 1444
Aimone Taparelli (1395–1495), Italian Roman Catholic priest, professed member from the Order of Preachers

See also
Amon (disambiguation)
Eamonn (given name)

Feminine given names